Halictophagidae are an insect family of the order Strepsiptera.

Genera
Halictophagus Curtis, 1831    
Membracixenos Pierce, 1952    
Stenocranophilus Pierce, 1914
wikispecies:TridactylophagusSubramaniam, 1932 
wikispecies:Coriophagus Kinzelbach, 1971

References

Strepsiptera
Insect families